Thomas Rhett Akins Jr. (born March 30, 1990) is an American country singer-songwriter. He is the son of singer Rhett Akins.

Rhett has released six studio albums for Big Machine Records' Valory Music imprint: It Goes Like This (2013), Tangled Up (2015), Life Changes (2017), Center Point Road (2019), Country Again: Side A (2021) and Where We Started (2022). He has received four Grammy Award nominations with two albums being nominated for Best Country Album in 2017 and 2019.

His five albums have produced 21 singles on the Billboard Hot Country and Country Airplay charts, with 17 reaching the No. 1 position on the latter: "It Goes Like This", "Get Me Some of That", "Make Me Wanna", "Crash and Burn", "Die a Happy Man", "T-Shirt", "Star of the Show", "Craving You", "Unforgettable", "Marry Me", "Life Changes", "Sixteen", “Remember You Young”, "Look What God Gave Her", "Beer Can't Fix", "What's Your Country Song", and "Country Again".

In addition to much of his own material, Rhett has written singles for Jason Aldean, Lee Brice, Florida Georgia Line, LoCash, and Michael Ray, among others.

Early life
Rhett was born in Valdosta, Georgia, to mother Paige Braswell and father Rhett Akins. He was raised in Hendersonville, Tennessee. He grew up knowing other singers including Tim McGraw and Brooks & Dunn. He has one younger sister, and two younger half-brothers; one on his mother's side, and one his father's side.

After learning to play drums while attending junior high school, Rhett later would go onstage with his father and play. In high school, he was part of a band named The High Heeled Flip Flops.  Rhett went to  Lipscomb University in Nashville, Tennessee, to study communications. He dropped out of college when he was 20 to pursue a career in music. He subsequently accepted a publishing deal by Big Machine Label Group to write songs.

Career

Songwriting
Rhett co-wrote the song "I Ain't Ready to Quit" on Jason Aldean's 2010 album My Kinda Party and signed a recording contract with Big Machine Records' Valory Music Group division in 2011. The album's first 21 weeks were spent in the top 40 of the Billboard 200; it also has sold 1.7 million in its first years of release. 
Rhett also co-wrote the 2013 singles "1994" by Jason Aldean, "Parking Lot Party" by Lee Brice, and "Round Here" by Florida Georgia Line. During the chart week of September 21, 2013, the Country Airplay chart included five songs within the top 10 that Rhett or his father had co-written, including "It Goes Like This".

2012–2015: It Goes Like This
In early 2012, he released his debut single, "Something to Do with My Hands", followed later that year by "Beer with Jesus". Both of these made top 30 on the Hot Country Songs charts. His third single, "It Goes Like This", topped the Country Airplay chart and also peaked at number 2 on the Hot Country Songs.

His debut album, also titled It Goes Like This, was released on October 29, 2013. The album's fourth single, "Get Me Some of That", became Rhett's second number 1 single in early 2014. The album's fifth single, "Make Me Wanna", was released to country radio on August 4, 2014. It reached number one on the Country Airplay chart on March 7, 2015. In between the two singles, Rhett sang guest vocals along with Justin Moore on Brantley Gilbert's "Small Town Throwdown".

2015–2017: Tangled Up
On April 7, 2015, Rhett released a new single titled "Crash and Burn" which served as the lead single to his second studio album. The album, Tangled Up, was released on September 25. It reached at number one on the Country Airplay chart in September 2015. The album's second single, "Die a Happy Man" released to country radio on September 28, 2015. It reached at number one on the Country Airplay, Hot Country Songs, and Canada Country chart in December 2015. and January 2016. It stayed at number one on the Country Airplay chart for 8 weeks, becoming the second song in the chart's history to do so. The album's third single, "T-Shirt" released to country radio on February 16, 2016. It reached at number one on the Country Airplay in June 2016, but received poor critical reviews criticizing its lyrical content. The album's fourth single, "Vacation" released to country radio on June 13, 2016. The album's fifth single, "Star of the Show", released to country radio on October 3, 2016.

2017–2020: Life Changes and Center Point Road
On September 8, Rhett released his third studio album Life Changes. It includes the chart-topping singles "Craving You" featuring Maren Morris, "Unforgettable", and "Marry Me". The title track was released as the album's fourth single on April 16, 2018. The album's fifth single was "Sixteen".

On March 1, 2019, Rhett released "Look What God Gave Her" as the lead-off single to his fourth studio album, Center Point Road. The following night, on Saturday Night Live, Rhett performed another new song from the album, called "Don't Threaten Me With a Good Time." The album was released on May 31. "Remember You Young" was the album's second single, while "Beer Can't Fix" featuring Jon Pardi was the third single.
 
In 2020, Rhett released the standalone single "Be a Light", a star-studded collaboration featuring Reba McEntire, Hillary Scott, Chris Tomlin and Keith Urban. All proceeds earned from the song are donated to the MusiCares COVID-19 Relief Fund. Rhett won Entertainer of the Year at the 2020 Academy of Country Music Awards. He co-wrote the song "Don't Need the Whiskey" by Dallas Smith, released in August 2020.

2021–present: Country Again and Where We Started
In March 2021, Rhett announced a double album release, with the first part, Country Again: Side A, released on April 30, 2021. It includes the singles "What's Your Country Song" and "Country Again". In November 2021, he released the single "Slow Down Summer", which is the lead single from his sixth studio album Where We Started, released on April 1, 2022. Rhett intends to release the album Country Again: Side B in late 2023.

Rhett also released a promotional single in 2022 titled "Death Row", which features guest vocals from Tyler Hubbard and Russell Dickerson.

On October 21, 2022, Rhett released his EP Merry Christmas, Y'all.

Personal life
Rhett married Lauren Akins ( Gregory), on October 12, 2012. In May 2017, they announced that they were adopting a baby girl from Uganda who was born on November 1, 2015, and were also expecting. They welcomed their daughter in August 2017. Their third daughter was born on February 10, 2020, and their fourth daughter was born on November 15, 2021.

Rhett is a Christian.

Discography 

 It Goes Like This (2013)
 Tangled Up (2015)
 Life Changes (2017)
 Center Point Road (2019)
 Country Again: Side A (2021)
 Where We Started (2022)
 Country Again: Side B (2023)

Tours
Headlining
 Home Team Tour (2017) 
Life Changes Tour (2018) 
Very Hot Summer Tour (2019)
Center Point Road Tour (2020-2021)
Home Team Tour (2023)
C2C: Country to Country (2023)

Supporting
Own the Night Tour with Lady Antebellum (2012)
Night Train Tour with Jason Aldean and Jake Owen (2013)
Anything Goes Tour with Florida Georgia Line and Frankie Ballard (2015)
Suits & Boots Tour (co-headlining) with Brett Eldredge (2015)
We Were Here Tour with Jason Aldean (2016)
C2C: Country to Country with Miranda Lambert, Dwight Yoakam and Ashley Monroe (2016)
Six String Circus Tour with Jason Aldean (2016)

Awards and nominations

Television appearances

He also sang a duet with Elmo and the gang on Sesame Street.

References

External links
 

1990 births
21st-century American musicians
21st-century American singers
21st-century American male singers
American country singer-songwriters
American male singer-songwriters
Big Machine Records artists
Country musicians from Georgia (U.S. state)
Country musicians from Tennessee
Living people
People from Valdosta, Georgia
Singer-songwriters from Georgia (U.S. state)
Singer-songwriters from Tennessee